Jennifer Dent (born February 10, 1981, as Jennifer Hopkins) is an American former professional tennis player.

Career
She won seven singles titles on the ITF Women's Circuit in her career and nearly cracked the top 50. In 2001, she reached her only WTA Tour singles final in Hobart (which she lost to Italian Rita Grande). In 2003, she played some ITF Circuit events, reaching the final in Atlanta and the semifinals at Dothan. In 2002, she won her only WTA doubles title at Strasbourg, partnering with Jelena Kostanić. However, she has never gone beyond the second round in any of the four major tournaments that make up the Grand Slam. She last played in an ITF tournament in October 2005 in Bangkok.

Personal life 
Jennifer married Taylor Dent on December 8, 2006, in Sarasota, Florida. On January 26, 2010, she gave birth to a baby boy named Declan James Phillip Dent. Hopkins and Dent currently reside in Keller, Texas, where the two along with Taylor's father, Phil Dent, are opening The Dent Tennis Academy located at The Birch Racquet and Lawn Club

References

External links
 
 

1981 births
Living people
Sportspeople from Kansas City, Missouri
American female tennis players
People from Leawood, Kansas
Tennis people from Kansas
Tennis people from Missouri
21st-century American women